James Joseph "Farmer" Burns (June 2, 1876 – ?) was a major league baseball player who pitched for the St. Louis Cardinals in 1901. He had previously attended Washington and Jefferson College, where he was a strong starting pitcher in 1898 for their team "The Presidents," though he never graduated.

References

 Statistics from baseball-reference.com
 St. Louis Cardinals pitching register
 Farmer Burns bio-SABR report "Steubenville Herald Star" article-June 22 1945

1876 births
St. Louis Cardinals players
Portland Webfeet players
Washington & Jefferson Presidents baseball players
Baseball players from Ohio
Sportspeople from Ashtabula, Ohio
Year of death unknown
Grand Rapids Boers players
Toledo Mud Hens players